Lightning Run is a Hyper GT-X roller coaster located at Kentucky Kingdom in Louisville, Kentucky. The ride is manufactured by Chance Rides and opened on May 24, 2014. The coaster is the only operational Hyper GT-X model coaster in the world.

History
In February 2010, Six Flags permanently closed Kentucky Kingdom after a negotiation could not be reached with the Kentucky State Fair Board for a new lease needed for the park. In May 2010, Local Investor Ed Hart returned to the fold to operate the park again almost 13 years after selling the park to Six Flags. However, after over one year of trying to negotiate with the fair board over a lease, negotiations with Hart abruptly ended in September 2011. At the start of 2012, the owners of Holiday World expressed interest in running the park and renaming it to Bluegrass Boardwalk, but those plans ended without success in June 2012. In August 2012, Ed Hart returned to the Fair Board with a new proposal which included a  Bolliger & Mabillard roller coaster, but the plans were slightly changed to a  roller coaster and a different manufacturer. Chance Rides was then hired to build a brand new coaster model for the park.

Reception
Lightning Run was ranked in the Amusement Today's Golden Ticket Awards for best new ride of 2014 with 9% of the vote, to come in fifth place.

References

Hypercoasters
Kentucky Kingdom
Roller coasters in Kentucky
Roller coasters introduced in 2014
2014 establishments in Kentucky